The 2021 SEC women's soccer tournament was the postseason women's soccer tournament for the Southeastern Conference held from October 31 to November 7, 2021. The tournament was held at the Orange Beach Sportsplex in Orange Beach, Alabama.  The ten-team single elimination tournament consisted of four rounds based on seeding from regular season conference play.  The Vanderbilt Commodores are the defending champions.  The Commodores were unable to defend their crown, losing to Florida in the First Round.  Tennessee won the tournament with a 1–0 victory over Arkansas in the final. The conference championship is the fifth for the Tennessee women's soccer program and the first for head coach Brian Pensky. As tournament champions, Tennessee earned the Southeastern Conference's automatic berth into the 2021 NCAA Division I Women's Soccer Tournament.

Qualification 
The top 10 teams in the conference qualified for the 2021 Tournament.  Tiebreakers were required to determine the third and fourth seeds as Ole Miss and South Carolina both finished with 6–3–1 regular season records.  Ole Miss was awarded the third seed and South Carolina earned the fourth seed based on Ole Miss' 2–1 victory over South Carolina during the regular season.  Another tiebreaker was required to determine the seeding for Alabama, Auburn, and Vanderbilt, as all three teams finished with a 5–4–1 conference record.  Due to the fact that all three teams did not play each other during the regular season points earned against common opponents was used as the tiebreaker.  Auburn was awarded the fifth seed based on their 4 points earned, Alabama was the 6th seed with 1 point earned, and Vanderbilt was the seventh seed with zero points earned.  There was another three way tie for the tenth, and final seed between Florida, Texas A&M, and Mississippi State as all three teams finished with a 3–6–1 conference record.  Again, all three teams had not played each other during the regular season, so points against common opponents was used.  All three teams scored 6 points against common opponents, so goal differential against common opponents was used.  Florida won this tiebreaker with a 0 GD and was awarded the tenth seed.  Texas A&M was the eleventh team with a -1 GD, and Mississippi State was the twelfth team with a -2 GD.

Bracket

Matches

First round

Quarterfinals

Semifinals

Final

Statistics

All-Tournament team 

MVP in boldSource:

References 

2021 Southeastern Conference women's soccer season
SEC Women's Soccer Tournament